Tan Hills is a village in County Durham, in England. It is situated close to Sacriston, Kimblesworth and Nettlesworth, between Durham and Chester-le-Street.

References

Villages in County Durham